Tommaso Morganti (died 1419) was a Roman Catholic prelate who served as Bishop of Lecce (1409–1419).

Biography
In 1409, Tommaso Morganti was appointed by Pope Gregory XII as Bishop of Lecce. He served as Bishop of Lecce until his death in 1419.

References

External links and additional sources
 (for Chronology of Bishops) 
 (for Chronology of Bishops) 

15th-century Italian Roman Catholic bishops
1419 deaths
Bishops appointed by Pope Gregory XII